Buk  is a town in central Poland, situated in the Greater Poland Voivodeship (since 1999), previously in Poznań Voivodeship (1975–1998). As of December 2021, the town has a population of 5,903.

The town's name means "Beech" in Polish, and the flag of the town shows a branch of beech, and three beech leaves. According to legend, Mieszko I, the first Christian ruler of Poland, died under a beech tree near the city.

Transport
The Polish Voivodeship roads 306 and 307 pass through the town, and the A2 motorway runs nearby, north of the town. There is also a train station in Buk.

Major corporations
 Wavin Metalplast-Buk sp. z o.o, Buk

References

Cities and towns in Greater Poland Voivodeship
Poznań County